Maher Hawsawi (born 4 November 1992) is a Saudi football player. He currently plays as a striker for Al-Orobah.

References

1992 births
Living people
Saudi Arabian footballers
Al Hilal SFC players
Al-Raed FC players
Al-Tai FC players
Al-Shoulla FC players
Al-Diriyah Club players
Al-Orobah FC players
Saudi First Division League players
Saudi Second Division players
Saudi Professional League players
Association football forwards